The Lane that Had No Turning, and Other Tales Concerning the People of Pontiac is a collection of short stories by Gilbert Parker, published in 1900 by Doubleday, Page & Co. and also that same year by Heinemann in London and by the Canadian publisher George N. Morang in Toronto. The first four stories in the collection (including the title story) had been published previously in The Illustrated London News. Parker dedicated the book to Canadian prime minister Sir Wilfrid Laurier, declaring his "sincere sympathy with French life and character, as exhibited in the democratic yet monarchial province of Quebec."

The book served as the basis for a silent film of the same title, released in 1922.

The following stories are included in the collection:
 The Lane that Had No Turning
 The Absurd Romance Of P’tite Louison
 The Little Bell Of Honour
 A Son of the Wilderness
 A Worker in Stone
 The Tragic Comedy of Annette
 The Marriage of the Miller
 Mathurin
 The Story of the Lime-Burner
 The Woodsman's Story of the Great White Chief
 Uncle Jim
 The House with the Tall Porch
 Parpon the Dwarf
 Times Were Hard in Pontiac
 Medallion's Whim
 The Prisoner
 An Upset Price
 A Fragment of Lives
 The Man that Died at Alma
 The Baron of Beaugard
 Parables of a Province
 The Golden Pipes
 The Guardian of the Fire
 By That Place Called Peradventure
 The Singing of the Bees
 There Was a Little City
 The Forge in the Valley 
The final six pieces in the collection, the so-called "Parables of a Province," are different in tone from the other stories, had not been as well received upon magazine publication, and have not always been included in later reprints of the work.

External links 
 The Lane that Had No Turning at Project Gutenberg (this edition does not include the "Parables of a Province," but does include one story, "The Tune MacGilveray Played," which was not included in the first edition of 1900).
 
 Discussion of The Lane that Had No Turning by Canadian literary historian Brian Busby.
 Annotated edition of The Lane that Had No Turning (Jen Rubio, ed.)

References 

Canadian short story collections
1900 short story collections
Books adapted into films